Mathis Nitschke (born 4 June 1973 in Munich) is a German composer and sound designer, director and producer. He has specialized in sound in connection with theatre, media and new technologies and produces his own music theatre projects in addition to applied music for stage and film.

Life and works 

After classical guitar he studied fine arts before he graduated in music composition from the Royal Conservatory of The Hague, Netherlands, followed by a M.A. program in media and communication at the European Graduate School, Saas-Fee. He is particularly interested in intertwining text, image and sound, music theatre and film, the play with all senses.

Since creating his first opera, JETZT, in 2012 with writer Jonas Lüscher, Nitschke has engaged in staging "sung theatre" programs. His research into the interplay of opera and society is evident in works like his 2014 premiered operatic song-cycle with party HAPPY HAPPY. JETZT earned a nomination for 'premier of the year' in the Opernwelt yearbook 2013.

Next to his short opera in a pharmacy VIOLA, he developed several more concepts for projects in public spaces. With the aid of a project grant by the city hall of Munich he could realize his vision of an Opera as location-aware sound walk.

In October 2017, “MAYA” had its premiere: a Mixed-Reality-Techno-Opera in which central questions of post-humanity have been discussed. In the ruins of the heating plant Aubing Nitschke created a virtual cosmos parallel to the real world, on the basis of sound, music, augmented reality technology and digital art, in which the audience could move freely.

Close cooperations with artist personalities like Michel Houellebecq or Luk Perceval have shaped his artistic work. In 2008, he composed and produced a grand orchestral score for Houellebecq's debut as film director of The possibility of an island which Houellebecq adapted from his acclaimed novel.

As a sound director Nitschke sits at the mixing desk not only in theatres but also at contemporary music performances in concert halls, such as the Musica Viva series of the Bavarian Radio Symphony orchestra. On occasion, in solo and ensemble projects, he performs as an improvising sound artist.

Since 2014, Nitschke has been holding seminars and workshops at the Musikhochschule Trossingen, the Hochschule der populären Künste Berlin and the Fachhochschule St. Pölten.

References

External links 
Official Website on mathis-nitschke.com
 

German composers
1973 births
Living people